The OECD Anti-Bribery Convention (officially Convention on Combating Bribery of Foreign Public Officials in International Business Transactions) is an anti-corruption convention of the OECD that requires signatory countries to criminalize bribery of foreign public officials. The convention is a legally binding international agreement that focuses on the supply side of bribery by criminalizing acts of offering or giving bribes to foreign public officials by companies or individuals. Its goal is to create a level playing field in the international business environment.

A 2017 study found that multinational corporations that were subject to the convention were less likely to engage in bribery than corporations that were based in non-member states. A 2021 study found that the convention may increase bribery by firms from non-ABC member countries and lead firms in ABC member countries to shift to bribery through intermediaries in non-ABC member countries.

History
In 1989, the OECD established an ad hoc working group for comparative review of national legislations regarding the bribery of foreign public officials. In 1994, the OECD Ministerial Council adopted the Recommendation of the Council on Bribery in International Business Transactions. The convention was signed on 17 December 1997 and came into force on 15 February 1999. A 2009 recommendation provides further guidance for signatory countries on how to deter and detect the supply side of foreign bribery and on how to investigate allegations.

Principles
Parties to the convention agree to establish the bribery of foreign public officials as a criminal offence under their laws and to investigate, prosecute and sanction this offence. Key elements of their commitments include creating a framework in which companiesnot just individualscan be held responsible for foreign bribery, establishing dissuasive sanctions and a basis for jurisdiction that is effective in combating bribery of foreign public officials, and co-operating with foreign law enforcement agencies in the fight against foreign bribery.

The OECD has no authority to implement the convention, but instead monitors implementation by participating countries. Countries are responsible for implementing laws and regulations that conform to the convention and therefore provide for enforcement. The OECD performs its monitoring function in a four-phased examination process, with Phase 4 launched on 16 March 2016.  Phase I consists of a review of legislation implementing the conventions in the member country with the goal of evaluating the adequacy of the laws.  Phase 2 assesses the effectiveness with which the legislation is applied.  Phase 3 assesses how well adherents are enforcing the convention, the 2009 recommendation, and any follow-up recommendations from Phase 2.  Phase 4 is intended to be a tailored review specific to the needs of the adherent country. The Working Group on Bribery prepares a public report at the end of each phase.  These reports are adopted under the principle of consensus minus one, meaning that the country under examination cannot block publication of the report.

Members
The convention is open to accession by any country which is a member of the OECD or has become a full participant in the OECD Working Group on Bribery in International Business Transactions.  As of 2018, 44 countries (the 37 member countries of the OECD and 7 non-member countries) have ratified or acceded to the convention:

Costa Rica, Lithuania, Colombia and Latvia are the most recent states to have ratified the convention, having done so on 23 July 2017, 16 May 2017, 19 January 2013 and 30 May 2014, respectively. Countries that have participated as observers in the Working Group include China, Peru, Indonesia, and Malaysia.

See also 
 European Public Prosecutor
 Group of States Against Corruption
 International Anti-Corruption Academy
 ISO 37001 Anti-bribery management systems
 Transparency International
 United Nations Convention against Corruption

References

External links
 OECD Anti-Bribery Convention

OECD treaties
Bribery
Treaties concluded in 1997
Treaties entered into force in 1999
Anti-corruption measures
Treaties of Australia
Treaties of Argentina
Treaties of Austria
Treaties of Belgium
Treaties of Brazil
Treaties of Canada
Treaties of Chile
Treaties of Colombia
Treaties of the Czech Republic
Treaties of Denmark
Treaties of Estonia
Treaties of Finland
Treaties of France
Treaties of Germany
Treaties of Greece
Treaties of Hungary
Treaties of Iceland
Treaties of Ireland
Treaties of Israel
Treaties of Italy
Treaties of Japan
Treaties of Latvia
Treaties of Luxembourg
Treaties of Mexico
Treaties of the Netherlands
Treaties of New Zealand
Treaties of Norway
Treaties of Poland
Treaties of Portugal
Treaties of Russia
Treaties of Slovakia
Treaties of Slovenia
Treaties of South Africa
Treaties of South Korea
Treaties of Spain
Treaties of Sweden
Treaties of Switzerland
Treaties of the United Kingdom
Treaties of the United States
Treaties of Turkey
Treaties of Bulgaria
International development treaties
1997 in France
Treaties extended to the Caribbean Netherlands
Treaties extended to the Faroe Islands
Treaties extended to Greenland